The Bite is a 1996 miniseries about an Australian adventurer who moves to Asia with his new wife. Ellie and Jack Shannon start a jewellery business in Burma, which is renowned for its rubies but is also one of the corners of the infamous heroin ‘Golden Triangle’. Things turn sinister when one of their biggest customers, Samira Nazib, reveals that drug-trafficking is the true nature of their business. The Shannons spy on her and her partner for the Australian Federal Police.

Production
This Australian-British co-production was shot 21 September to 30 November 1995 in Australia and Thailand. It was written by Terry Johnson and directed by Michael Carson. The producers were Lavinia Warner  and David Elfick, with Executive Producers Sue Masters and Michael Wearing.

Cast
 Hugo Weaving
 Lesley Manville
 Keith Allen
 Pamela Rabe
 Frank Gallagher
 Rebekah Jaye

References

External links
The Bite at IMDb

1990s Australian television miniseries
1996 Australian television series debuts
1996 Australian television series endings